Denis Robin may refer to:

 Denis Robin (civil servant) (born 1962), French civil servant
 Denis Robin (cyclist) (born 1979), French road racing cyclist